Place de la Concorde or Viscount Lepic and his Daughters Crossing the Place de la Concorde is an 1879 oil painting by Edgar Degas. It depicts the cigar-smoking Ludovic-Napoléon Lepic, his daughters, his dog, and a solitary man on the left at Place de la Concorde in Paris. The Tuileries Gardens can be seen in the background, behind a stone wall.

Many art historians believe that the large amount of negative space, the cropping, and the way in which the figures are facing in random directions were influenced by photography.

The painting was considered lost for four decades following World War II, until Russian authorities put it on exhibition at the Hermitage Museum in Russia, where it remains to this day. During the Soviet occupation of Germany, the work was confiscated by the Soviets from the collection of German art collector Otto Gerstenberg and eventually moved to the Hermitage.

Degas also painted Ludovic Lepic and His Daughters in a separate painting.

References

External links 
 Hermitage's interactive page about the painting
 Olga's Gallery biography of Degas
 
 Degas – Place de la Concorde Painting A video discussion about the painting from Smarthistory, Khan Academy.
Degas: The Artist's Mind, exhibition catalog from The Metropolitan Museum of Art fully available online as PDF, which contains material on Place de la Concorde (see index)

1876 paintings
Paintings by Edgar Degas
Dogs in art
Paintings in the collection of the Hermitage Museum